Howard Wesley Johnson (July 2, 1922 – December 12, 2009) was an American educator. He served as dean of the MIT Sloan School of Management between 1959 and 1966,  president of MIT between 1966 and 1971, and chairman of the MIT Corporation (the university's board of trustees) from 1971 to 1983. He was a member of both the American Academy of Arts and Sciences and the American Philosophical Society.

Education and early career
Johnson graduated in 1943 with a bachelor's degree in business from Central College in Chicago.  He served in the Army in Europe during World War II, and returned to earn a master's degree in economics at the University of Chicago, where he taught from 1948 to 1955.  He joined the MIT faculty as an associate professor of management in 1955.

Selected works 
 Holding the Center: Memoirs of a Life in Higher Education, MIT Press, 2001.

References

1922 births
2009 deaths
Presidents of the Massachusetts Institute of Technology
United States Army personnel of World War II
MIT Sloan School of Management faculty
University of Chicago alumni
Members of the American Philosophical Society
20th-century American academics